Friedrich or Friedrichs is a German surname. Notable people with the surname include:

Friedrich 
 Johannes Friedrich, Bishop of the Evangelical Lutheran Church in Bavaria
 Ariane Friedrich, German high jumper
 Arne Friedrich, German football player
 Bruce Friedrich, United States campaigner for the ethical treatment of animals
 Christian Friedrich (baseball), American baseball player
 Johann Friedrich, German theologian
 John Friedrich (fraudster), Australian conman
 Jörg Friedrich, independent historian and writer
 Jörg Friedrich, German rower
 Karl-Heinz Friedrich (born 1934), German artistic gymnast
 Manuel Friedrich, German football player
 Wolf Matthias Friedrich, German classical singer

Politics 
 Carl Joachim Friedrich, political scientist
 Dwight Friedrich (1913-1993), American politician and businessman
 Hans-Peter Friedrich, German MP
 Ingo Friedrich, German MEP
 István Friedrich, Hungarian politician
 Rudolf Friedrich (1923–2013), Swiss politician and lawyer

Artistry 

 Caspar David Friedrich, German Romantic painter
 Gary Friedrich, United States comic book writer
 Mike Friedrich, United States comic book writer

Friedrichs 

 Fritz Friedrichs (18491918), operatic baritone
 Fritz Walter Paul Friedrichs (18821958), also published under the name Fritz Friedrichs, German chemist, and inventor of the Friedrichs condenser
 Hanns Joachim Friedrichs (19271995), German journalist
 Kurt Otto Friedrichs (19011983), American mathematician
  Rebecca Friedrichs, lead plaintiff in Friedrichs v. California Teachers Association, a 2016 U.S. Supreme Court case

See also 

 Fredericks (surname)
 Frederick (given name)
 Friedreich
 Friz
 Friedrichs v. California Teachers Ass'n

German-language surnames
Patronymic surnames